Moyano is a surname. Notable people with the surname include:

 Alexia Betiana Moyano (born 1982), Argentine actress
 Antonio Moyano Carrasquilla (born 2000), Spanish footballer
 Aurelio Moyano (1938–2020), Argentine footballer
 Diego Moyano (born 1975), Argentine former professional tennis player
 Enzo Josue Moyano (born 1989), Argentine cyclist 
 Fabián Gustavo Moyano Batres (born 1986), Argentine footballer 
 Francisco Sebastián "Sebas" Moyano Jiménez (born 1997), Spanish footballer 
 Franco David Moyano (born 1997), Argentine professional footballer
 Gabriel Oscar Moyano Agüero (born 1992), Argentine footballer
 Hugo Moyano (born 1944), Argentine syndicalist
 Javier 'Javi' Moyano Lujano (born 1986), Spanish professional footballer
 Manuel Moyano (born 1963), Spanish writer
 María Elena Moyano Delgado (1958–1992), Peruvian activist
 Martha Lupe Moyano Delgado (born 1964), Peruvian nurse and politician 
 Martín Bustos Moyano (born 1985), Argentine rugby union player
 Miguel Moyano, Colombian artist
 Mònica López Moyano (born 1975), Spanish meteorologist and television presenter
 Ramiro Moyano (born 1990), Argentine rugby union player
 Ricardo Moyano Argentinian musician and composer
 Santiago Moyano (born 1997), Argentine professional footballer
 Sebastián Moyano (1480–1551),  Spanish conquistador, also known as Sebastián de Belalcázar
 Sebastián Emanuel Moyano (born 1990), Argentine professional footballer
 Walter Moyano (born 1933), Uruguayan cyclist
 Xavier Moyano (born 1981), Argentine musician; producer, performer, composer, and educator